Basalt is a rural locality in the Charters Towers Region, Queensland, Australia.

Geography 
In the north and west lies the Clarke River.  The Burdekin River drains the south where a confluence of waterways meet.  Dalrymple National Park was established along the Burdekin in 1990.  In the south west is the Great Basalt Wall National Park.

The area has road access via the Gregory Developmental Road. The Hervey Range Developmental Road enters from the east to intersect the Gregory Highway.

The now-closed Greenvale railway line passed through the locality with Tulay railway station now abandoned.

History

Heritage listings 
There are a number of heritage sites in Basalt, including:
 Lolworth Creek Battery
 Bluff Downs Station: Hann Family Grave

References

Charters Towers Region
Localities in Queensland
Mining towns in Queensland